The 2012 congressional election in Montana was held on November 6, 2012, to determine who would represent the state of Montana in the United States House of Representatives. At the time, Montana had one seat in the House. Incumbent Denny Rehberg did not run for reelection, choosing instead to run for the seat in the U.S. Senate. A primary election was held on June 5, 2012. Republican  businessman Steve Daines won the open seat.

Republican primary

Candidates
 Eric Brosten, author and engineer
 Steve Daines, businessman and nominee for Lieutenant Governor in 2008
 Vincent Melkus, student at Colorado Mesa University and former Marine

Withdrawn
 John Abarr, Ku Klux Klan member

Hypothetical polling

Results

Democratic primary

Candidates
 Kim Gillan, state senator from Billings
 Sam Rankin, real estate salesman and candidate for the at-large House seat in 2010
 Diane Smith, businesswoman
 Dave Strohmaier, Missoula city council member
 Rob Stutz, attorney
 Jason Ward, farmer and construction manager for the Crow Nation
 Franke Wilmer, state representative from Bozeman

Declined to run
 Melinda Gopher, writer and candidate for the at-large House seat in 2010
 Brian Schweitzer, Governor of Montana

Polling

Results

General election

Candidates
 Steve Daines (R), businessman
 Kim Gillan (D), state Senator
 David Kaiser (Libertarian)

Polling

Results

References

External links
Elections at the Montana Secretary of State
United States House of Representatives elections in Montana, 2012 at Ballotpedia
Montana U.S. House at OurCampaigns.com
Campaign contributions for U.S. Congressional races in Montana at OpenSecrets
Outside spending at the Sunlight Foundation
Campaign websites
Steve Daines campaign website
Kim Gillan campaign website
David Kaiser campaign website

House of Representatives
Montana
2012